Events in the year 1901 in Portugal. There were 598,000 voters in the country.

Incumbents
Monarch: Carlos I
President of the Council of Ministers: Ernesto Hintze Ribeiro

Events
 Establishment of the Liberal Regenerator Party
 6 October - Legislative election

References

 
Portugal
Years of the 20th century in Portugal
Portugal